Christina Smith (born May 10, 1945) is an American make-up artist. Since her start in 1972 she has had 79 makeup credits to date.

Oscar nominations
Both nominations were in the category of Best Makeup.

1991 Academy Awards-Nominated for Hook, nomination shared with Greg Cannom and Monty Westmore. Lost to Terminator 2: Judgment Day.
1993 Academy Awards-Nominated for Schindler's List, nomination shared with Judith A. Cory and Matthew W. Mungle. Lost to Mrs. Doubtfire.

Selected filmography

Ted (2012)
Resident Evil: Afterlife (2010)
Law Abiding Citizen (2009)
Drillbit Taylor (2008)
Seraphim Falls (2006)
The Skeleton Key (2005)
Sky High (2005)
Raising Helen (2004)
Freaky Friday (2003)
K-19: The Widowmaker (2002)
Resident Evil (2002)
Inspector Gadget (1999)
American History X (1998)
Small Soldiers (1998)
The Lost World: Jurassic Park (1997)
Casper (1995)
Congo (1995)
The Flintstones (1994)
Jurassic Park (1993)
Schindler's List (1993)
Hook (1991)
Steel Magnolias (1989)
Firefox (1982)
New York, New York (1977)

References

External links

Living people
1945 births
Artists from New York City
American make-up artists